The Hollywood Knights is a 1980 American teen comedy film written and directed by Floyd Mutrux depicting the crass and mischievous antics and practical jokes of the remaining members of a 1950s-era car club turned social fraternity in and around Beverly Hills and Hollywood in 1965.  The cast, led by Robert Wuhl as the fraternity's charismatic leader, features Tony Danza and Michelle Pfeiffer in their film debuts, as well as Fran Drescher and Stuart Pankin in supporting roles.

This was the inaugural film credit of PolyGram Filmed Entertainment (as PolyGram Pictures), a British studio that aimed to compete with Hollywood.

Plot

On Halloween night in the year 1965, Newbomb Turk is the leader the Hollywood Knights, a car club made up of teenage boys who play pranks, harass the police and display their cars at Tubby's Drive-In restaurant in Beverly Hills, California. Their way of life is about to change because Tubby's is being demolished to be replaced by a new office building. As the Knights find ways to rebel against the plan, they are also busy with the initiation of four new club pledges on Halloween night. After the pledges are stripped, they are deposited in the Watts district of Los Angeles, California, to ensure that the dedication to Tubby's is read on air at 2:00 a.m. that night at a local radio station. The Knights have fun but never for long because, whenever possible, Officers Clark and Bimbeau lecture them about their juvenile behavior.

At Tubby's, Suzie Q, one of the drive-in carhops, and Duke, a fellow Knight and her mechanic boyfriend, argue that she receives too much male attention on the job, and how her desire to be an actress interferes with their relationship. For the teens, Tubby's is the place to talk cars, see friends and arrange races. Jimmy Shine, Duke's friend, has enlisted in the military although he does not expect to see combat in Vietnam because the government is sending advisors not troops.

In the high school parking lot, Newbomb wears a rubber wolf mask in order to seduce girls, but he is recognized and rejected. The Knights ambush the local nerd Dudley Laywicker on his way to a pep rally. Newbomb steals the smart and unpopular nerd student's red “major domo”  band jacket and hat, pretends he is Dudley, and accepts his scholarship award. Afterward, Newbomb performs a song, using the microphone to simulate flatulence until he is chased from the gymnasium. In one of the funniest lines in small film history, an old codger member of the High School advisory committee tries to file a police complaint on Newbomb for “fahting”.

On the street, Clark and Bimbeau tow Newbomb's older brother's illegal parked El Camino which he is supposed to guard with his life.  Newbomb returns to Tubby's in his parents 1956 Chevy sedan station wagon/delivery vehicle "The pie wagon" (Newbomb's parents own and operate a local bakery), where he tape records a conversation between the Ironbox twins in the women's restroom and starts a food fight.

While driving on Sunset Boulevard, fellow Knight Simpson is worried that the Knights will disappear because so many members have plans after high school, but Wheatly, another Knight, assures him that the club will never die. Later, Newbomb and his buddies urinate in the punch of the Beverly Hills Neighborhood Association Halloween party, the group responsible for Tubby's demise.

On the way to the party's talent contest, Newbomb and his friends ambush Dudley once again and steal his magician's costume. At the party, Newbomb entertains guests by broadcasting his recording of the Ironbox twins’ bathroom gossip. Then, Wheatly pretends to be Sasha Dabinsky, the one-armed violinist, and Newbomb is his piano accompanist. Walking by Newbomb's car, Sally, a high school student, complains to Dark, her collegiate boyfriend, that he is dull compared to Newbomb. When Dark abandons Sally, she invites Newbomb to a pool party at her house. In the car, Sally is disappointed when a romantic moment with Newbomb is interrupted by his premature ejaculation.

Later at Smitty's Speed Shop, a place for repairs and restorations located next door to Tubby's, Duke and a few buddies present Jimmy with a beautifully restored sports car as a farewell gift. He is touched but requests that the car be left to the Knights and not to his girlfriend, should anything happen to him. Nearby, Newbomb and his gang get revenge after Bimbeau taunts him about his missing sedan delivery. Bimbeau is locked in Tubby's men's room with an overflowing toilet until Clark rescues him. Suddenly, Dudley fakes a seizure, and Bimbeau is so flustered that he crashes the patrol car as he leaves Tubby's. Meanwhile, Dudley's excitement about being part of a victorious drag race team reaches new heights when Jimmy gives Dudley his Knight's jacket to safeguard while he is away.

As the film comes to an end, Duke admits to Suzie Q that he is afraid of losing her to a career but she reassures him of her love. The four pledges return to Tubby's victorious as the Knights hear the radio dedication as the clock strikes 2:00 AM, and Dudley calls home to inform his mother that he will be home very late or not at all. Newbomb moons Mrs. Friedman and Dudley is so all of them that he takes his glasses off for a better look. The final shot shows the lights of Tubby's being turned off for good.

Cast

Production
The filming location for the "Tubby's Drive-In" scenes was an old A&W Root Beer drive-in location that had closed a few years prior at 7310 Van Nuys Blvd, in Los Angeles, California.

Robert Wuhl, Tony Danza and Stuart Pankin all played teenage characters, although Wuhl and Danza were both in their late twenties, and Pankin was 33 years old.

Director Floyd Mutrux revealed on the audio commentary of the Columbia DVD release that he was at one point going to direct Urban Cowboy (1980), and that he would have been likely to cast Michelle Pfeiffer in the role of Sissy. The producer of that film, Robert Evans, also preferred Pfeiffer, but the eventual director, James Bridges, refused to cast anyone but Debra Winger in the part.

Legacy
Widely considered to be an inferior rip-off of American Graffiti, today the film is primarily notable for the debut performances of many well-known actors.

Tony Danza was noted for having played dimwitted boxer Tony Banta on the television sitcom Taxi since 1978, but he had not appeared in a feature film prior to this production.
The lead role of Newbomb Turk was former stand-up comic Robert Wuhl's first film performance, and he would later win two Emmy Awards in the category of Outstanding Writing in a Variety, Music or Comedy Program for his collaboration with Billy Crystal on the script of the 63rd and 64th Academy Awards ceremonies.
Fran Drescher was at the time a relatively unknown actress, who would go on to achieve fame through co-creating and starring in the sitcom The Nanny from 1993 to 1999.
The Columbus, Ohio band New Bomb Turks took their name from the film's protagonist.
Melt Bar and Grilled in Lakewood, Ohio named a sandwich The Newbomb Turkey Club in honor of the film's protagonist.
The 1957 Chevy Bel Air 210 driven by Tony Danza and Michelle Pfieffer is a famous project car called Project X that began life as a magazine test mule for Popular Hot Rodding in 1965.  Today it is owned by Hot Rod Magazine and is still a prominent player in the hot rodding industry. It is considered by many to be the most famous '57 Chevy in history.

References

External links
 
 
 
 

American teen comedy films
Teen sex comedy films
1980 films
1980s teen comedy films
1980s sex comedy films
American auto racing films
American sex comedy films
1980s English-language films
Columbia Pictures films
Films set in 1965
Films set in Beverly Hills, California
Films directed by Floyd Mutrux
American films about Halloween
PolyGram Filmed Entertainment films
Films with screenplays by Floyd Mutrux
1980s American films